The Great Northern Hurdles is one of New Zealand's feature jumping races.

History

The race has been run in early September since 2005, after previously being held in early June. 

For most of its life the race was run over 4190m at Ellerslie Racecourse in Auckland. However, the race was moved to Te Aroha in:

 2018, raced over 4200m, due to a track upgrade at Ellerslie
 2021, raced over 4200m on October 3rd, due to COVID-19 restrictions.

The 2020 race was held on October 17th.

The race is no longer held at Ellerslie after the Auckland Racing Club sold land for housing development. The 2022 race was held at Te Rapa.

The Great Northern Hurdles is raced on the same day as the Great Northern Steeplechase.

Recent results

See also

 Thoroughbred racing in New Zealand

References 

Horse races in New Zealand